A patio (from  ; "courtyard", "forecourt", "yard", "little garden") is an outdoor space generally used for dining or recreation that adjoins a structure and is typically paved. In Australia the term is expanded to include roofed structures such as a veranda, which provides protection from sun and rain.

Construction
Patios are most commonly paved with concrete or stone slabs (also known as paving flags). They can also be created using  bricks, block paving, tiles, cobbles, or gravel. Other kinds of patio materials these days include alumawood, aluminum, acrylic, and glass.

Patio options include concrete, stamped concrete, and aggregate concrete. Stamped concrete costs more, is known to be slippery, requires being resealed, and dyes typically fade in time. Aggregate concrete uses stones exposed giving its own style.

Other common patio features include additional of reinforcement for hot tubs and additional steps from the home.

Restaurant patio

Patio is also a general term used for outdoor seating at restaurants, especially in Canadian English. While common in Europe even before 1900, eating outdoors at restaurants in North America was exotic until the 1940s. The Hotel St. Moritz in New York in the 1950s advertised itself as having the first true continental cafe with outdoor seating. The Toronto Star welcomed that city's first patio in the 1960s. In the United States, having a warmer and sunnier climate than Northern Europe, outdoor dining grew rapidly in the 1960s and today is a popular dining experience in the warmer parts of the mainland.

See also
 Andalusian patio
 Arizona room
 Deck
 Porch
 Terrace garden
 Veranda

Notes

References

External links
 
 

Architectural elements
Outdoor structures
Garden features